James Thompson (born 18 November 1986) is a South African rower. He attended school at St. Andrew's College, Grahamstown. He joined the Tuks rowing club and received a Sport Sciences degree from the University of Pretoria. Thompson won a gold medal in the Men's lightweight coxless four event at the 2012 Summer Olympics, with teammates John Smith, Matthew Brittain, and Sizwe Ndlovu.

Thompson retired as a professional rower on 4 February 2017 after competing at the Rock the Boat regatta at Roodeplaat Dam.

References

External links
 

1986 births
Living people
South African male rowers
Olympic rowers of South Africa
Olympic gold medalists for South Africa
Olympic medalists in rowing
Rowers at the 2012 Summer Olympics
Rowers at the 2016 Summer Olympics
Sportspeople from Cape Town
Medalists at the 2012 Summer Olympics
Alumni of St. Andrew's College, Grahamstown
World Rowing Championships medalists for South Africa
South African people of British descent
21st-century South African people